Kai Tracid (born as Kai Franz on 17 January 1972) is a trance DJ and producer. The name Tracid originates from the combination of the two electronic music styles trance and acid.

Career
In Germany he became famous with his first single, "Your Own Reality". In 1998 he gained worldwide fame with Liquid Skies. In November 2001 he got his first Top-10 hit in the German single charts.

In 2009 he took an indefinite hiatus from making music and co-founded a yoga center Balance Yoga.

In February 2020, Tracid announced his return to the scene with the release of his new single "DT64", a collaboration with Moguai.

Discography

Albums
 Skywalker 1999 (1999)
 Trance & Acid (2002)
 Contemplate (The Reason You Exist) (2003)

Singles
 303 State featuring Ramon Tapia (2020)
 Freedom of Expression featuring Tom Wax - ASYS (2020)
 DT64 featuring MOGUAI (2020)
 Wrong or Right featuring ASYS (2021)

Remix albums
 Remix Collection (2012)

Singles

Early works

Acid Train / Sweat Room (1995) As A*S*Y*S
Acid Squid (1996) As A*S*Y*S
Radon (1996) As Mac Acid II
Only The Strong (1996) As K
Waveshaper (1999) As K
The Spice (1999) As Arrakis
Auf Die Fresse / Säurebad (1999) As Warmduscher
Säurebad (The Remixes) (1999) As Warmduscher
Acid Save Your Soul (1999) As A*S*Y*S
Acid Head Cracker (2000) As A*S*Y*S
10 Kleine Bassdrums (2000) As Warmduscher
Acid Nightmare / DJ's Nightmare (2001) As A*S*Y*S
Hardcore Will Never Die (2002) As Warmduscher feat. Lamont Humphrey
From Past To Phuture (2003) As A*S*Y*S
No More Fucking Rock'n'Roll (2004) As A*S*Y*S
Acid Flash (2005) As A*S*Y*S
Cheers (2007) As A*S*Y*S

References

External links 
 
 Russian Kai Tracid Web
 Tracid Traxxx
 Got on position 41 in DJ Mag poll 2005
 Kai Tracid
 A Dose of Trance and Acid – 5 minutes with Kai Tracid, Interview in ResidentAdvisor.net, Australia, 2005

German trance musicians
Club DJs
German DJs
Living people
1972 births
Electronic dance music DJs